Padak is a South Korean chicken dish made from fried chicken and scallions.

See also 
 List of chicken dishes

References 

South Korean chicken dishes
Fried chicken